The Wallaby-class water and fuel lighter is a class of four Australian-built lighters which have supported the Royal Australian Navy (RAN) since 1981. The vessels were originally operated by the RAN, but were transferred to DMS Maritime after 1997.

Their main role is to transport diesel fuel and desalinated water and remove sullage and ballast waters for the RAN, although they can also be used to control oil spills.

The Wallaby-class craft are scheduled to be disposed of over the next few years, with replacement water fuel lighters proposed by DMS Maritime.

Ships

Citations

References
 
 

Auxiliary ships of the Royal Australian Navy
Auxiliary lighter classes